Taizhou railway station can refer to the following stations in China:

Jiangsu Province
  on Nanjing–Qidong railway.

Zhejiang Province
Taizhou railway station (Zhejiang Province), a station on the Hangzhou-Taizhou high-speed railway.
Taizhou West railway station, formerly known as Taizhou railway station, a station on the Yongtaiwen Railway and Jinhua–Taizhou railway.